"Momentary Bliss" is a song by British virtual band Gorillaz, featuring British rapper Slowthai and the Kent-based punk rock duo Slaves. The song was the first song to be released for Gorillaz' Song Machine initiative, a web series consisting of singles and music videos released over the course of the year from the band, with each episode featuring different guest musicians on new Gorillaz material, and is the first single released for their seventh studio album, Song Machine, Season One: Strange Timez. This was the final single before Slaves change their band name "Soft Play".

Background and recording
"Momentary Bliss" was recorded in the summer of 2019 at Damon Albarn's Studio 13 in West London. Albarn had previously worked with Slaves as part of the Africa Express project, with the band also previously working with Slowthai on his album Nothing Great About Britain, on the song "Missing".

The song was announced as being the first of eleven tracks to be released from Gorillaz' Song Machine initiative, which sees the band release a new song every month with previously unannounced collaborators. Damon Albarn and Remi Kabaka spoke to BBC Radio 1's Annie Mac for the song's official premiere, saying that Song Machine "may have an obtuse narrative arc at the end of each season, but it's more Ozark, than Designated Survivor. You just keep going until you run out of ideas."

A press release was put out to explain the initiative further, with virtual Gorillaz member Russel Hobbs saying: "Song Machine is a whole new way of doing what we do, Gorillaz breaking the mould 'cos the mould got old. World is moving faster than a supercharged particle, so we've gotta stay ready to drop. We don't even know who's stepping through the studio next. Song Machine feeds on the unknown, runs on pure chaos. So whatever the hell's coming, we're primed and ready to produce like there's no tomorrow."

Composition
Critics have described the single as punk rock, electronic, pop punk, ska, hip hop, britpop and reggae rock. Mark Beaumont of The Independent described the song as “sci-fi ska”. Thereafter, Thomas Smith of NME noted the punk timbre, describing the song as a “punk rager”.

Damon Albarn utilizes an interpolation of the chorus of "Lovely Rita" by The Beatles; this interpolation takes place before Slowthai's first verse, before 2-D's verse, and in both Holman's intro and ending chorus.

Music video
The song's music video was filmed at Albarn's studio in West London, featuring both Slowthai and Slaves. The video which premiered on 30 January 2020 features the band's animated characters recording the song with guests. The video also marked the return of Murdoc Niccals, who had been absent from the band's sixth studio album The Now Now.

In the video, directed by Jamie Hewlett, Tim McCourt, and Max Taylor, Murdoc attempts to poison Albarn's drink during a recording session but ends up becoming sick after observing no side effects and testing the poison on himself.

Tracklist

Personnel
Gorillaz
 Damon Albarn – vocals, instrumentation, director, guitar
 Jamie Hewlett – artwork, character design, video direction
 Remi Kabaka Jr. – drum programming

Additional musicians and personnel
Slowthai – vocals
Laurie Vincent – guitar, vocals
Isaac Holman – drums, vocals
Mike Dean – drum programming
Stephen Sedgwick – mixing engineer, engineering
Samuel Egglenton – engineering 
John Davis – mastering engineer

Charts

References

2019 songs
2020 singles
Gorillaz songs
British pop punk songs
British punk rock songs
Parlophone singles
Reggae rock songs
Slowthai songs
Songs written by Damon Albarn
Songs written by Mike Dean (record producer)
Songs written by Remi Kabaka Jr.
Songs written by Slowthai
Song Machine
Warner Records singles